The Zee Cine Award Best Playback Singer – Female is awarded to a female playback singer who works in the Hindi film industry. The winner is selected from a shortlist by a jury, and announced at the annual Zee Cine Awards ceremony.

List of nominees and winners

1990s

2000s

2010s

2020s

See also 
 Zee Cine Awards
 Hindi cinema
 Cinema of India
 List of music awards honoring women

Zee Cine Awards
Music awards honoring women